This table displays the top-rated primetime television series of the 2008–09 season as measured by Nielsen Media Research.

References

2008 in American television
2009 in American television
2008-related lists
2009-related lists
Lists of American television series